Lautaro Mur (born 7 April 1997) is an Argentine professional footballer who plays as a midfielder for Estudiantes RC.

Career
Mur began his career with Defensores de Belgrano. He made his professional debut at the back end of the 2016–17 Primera B Metropolitana season during a defeat to Almirante Brown, which preceded five further appearances as they were eliminated from the promotion play-offs by Estudiantes. He featured just three times in the club's promotion-winning campaign of 2017–18, but did score his first senior goal in the process against Tristán Suárez on 29 November 2017. 

In January 2022, Mur moved to fellow league club Estudiantes de Río Cuarto.

Personal life
In September 2020, it was confirmed that Mur had tested positive for COVID-19 amid the pandemic.

Career statistics
.

References

External links

1997 births
Living people
Footballers from Buenos Aires
Argentine footballers
Association football midfielders
Defensores de Belgrano footballers
Estudiantes de Río Cuarto footballers
Primera B Metropolitana players
Primera Nacional players
21st-century Argentine people